Asbjørn Schaathun (born 22 June 1961) is a Norwegian contemporary composer.

Career
Schaathun studied at the Norwegian Academy of Music and Royal College of Music in London and IRCAM in Paris.

Schaathun founded the Norwegian Academy of Music’s Contemporary Music Ensemble and in 1986 he initiated the Oslo Sinfonietta. Schaathun  also served as the director of the Norwegian Society of Composers from 2006 to 2012 and was appointed as professor in composition at the Norwegian Academy of Music in 2013. From 2010 to 2012, he served as the chairman of the Council of Nordic Composers.

Prizes and awards
 1987 Norwegian Society of Composers: «Performer of the Year» as artistic director for Oslo Sinfonietta
 1991 The Gaudeamus Fondation’s Louis Vuitton Prize for his bass clarinet concerto "Actions, Interpolations and Analyses". 
 1992 Bang & Olufsen’s Music Prize.
 2008  The Lindeman Prize

Production

Selected works
 Ohne Titel - London 1985 (2016-17)
 Nations for piano and orchestra (2015-16)
 Concerto Grosso (2014)
 Lament II for chamber ensemble (2013-14)
 Wie die Zeit die Materie verändert (III) for orchestra (2007)
 Musical Graffiti II, "virtuoso drawings for amplified piano, large ensemble and tape with cosmic sounds" (1983–84)
 Physis for piano and live-electronics (1986/2003)
 Action, Interpolations and Analyses,  concerto for bass clarinet and large ensemble (1988–90) 
 Double Portrait" for violin and large ensemble (1991-92/1996/2002-06)
 "s" – Miniatüre pour ensemble (1992)
 A Tabular System... for horn, oboe, harp and percussion (1988/1994-95)

Discography
 Nordic Voices, Djånki Don (2008)
 Stavanger New Music Ensemble, 1-2-3 Happy Happy Happy!  (2001)
 Oslo Sinfonietta, Actions, Interpolations & Analyses (1995)
 Håkon Austbø, Wanted (2011)
 Frode Haltli, Looking on darkness (2002)
 Cikada Ensemble, Svorsk, Swegian (1996)
 The Cikada Ensemble (1992)
 Kenneth Karlsson - the view was all in lines'' (2012)

References

External links
List of Works supplied by the National Library of Norway

1961 births
21st-century classical composers
Living people
Norwegian contemporary classical composers
Norwegian male classical composers
21st-century Norwegian male musicians